Christian Celesia (born 22 January 2002) is an Italian professional footballer who plays as a defender for  club Messina on loan from Torino.

Career 
Celesia grew up in the Torino youth system and made his debut for the club on 2 August 2020 against Bologna. On 13 August 2020, he signed his first contract with the club, until 2023.

On 17 August 2021 he went to Alessandria on loan. On 26 January 2022, he moved on a new loan to Paganese.

On 14 July 2022, Celesia signed with Potenza on loan for the 2022–23 season. On 26 January 2023, he moved to Messina.

Career statistics

Club

References

2002 births
Living people
Italian footballers
Association football defenders
Torino F.C. players
U.S. Alessandria Calcio 1912 players
Paganese Calcio 1926 players
Potenza Calcio players
A.C.R. Messina players
Serie A players
Serie B players
Serie C players